Marino Fontana (14 March 1936 – 11 June 2013) was an Italian road cyclist. Professional from 1960 to 1966, he notably won the 1961 Giro di Toscana and finished third in the 1960 Giro di Lombardia. He also rode in seven ditions of the Giro d'Italia, with his best finish being 21st in 1963. After retiring, he worked as a directeur sportif for several teams.

Major results

1955
 1st Trofeo Alcide Degasperi
1957
 2nd Piccolo Giro di Lombardia
1959
 2nd Piccolo Giro di Lombardia
1960
 3rd Giro di Lombardia
 5th Coppa Agostoni
1961
 1st Giro di Toscana
 4th Giro di Romagna
1962
 2nd Giro di Romagna
 4th Coppa Placci
 9th Giro di Toscana
1963
 3rd Giro di Romagna
 4th Overall Tour de Romandie
 4th Züri-Metzgete
 4th Giro di Toscana
1964
 2nd Giro del Lazio
 3rd Col San Martino
 10th Milano–Vignola
1965
 7th Overall Tour de Suisse
1966
 5th Züri-Metzgete

References

External links

1936 births
2013 deaths
Italian male cyclists
Cyclists from the Province of Vicenza